Brahma Kumar may refer to 
 A male follower of the Brahma Kumaris World Spiritual University.
 A male follower of the Adhyatmik Ishwariya Vishwa Vidyalaya, also known as Prajapita Brahma Kumaris.

See also
 Brahmin
 Kumar
 Kumar (disambiguation)